Mont Charvin can refer to:

 Mont Charvin (Aravis), a mountain in Savoie and Haute-Savoie, France
 Mont Charvin (Maurienne), a mountain in Maurienne, Savoie, France